JSyn ("Java Synthesis") is a free API for developing interactive sound applications in Java.  Developed by Phil Burk and others, it is distributed through Burk's company, Mobileer Inc.  JSyn has a flexible, unit generator-based synthesis and DSP architecture that allows developers to create synthesizers, audio playback routines, and effects processing algorithms within a Java framework that allows for easy integration with other Java routines (e.g. graphics, user interface, etc.).  A plugin is available for web browsers to run JSyn-enabled applets distributed over the World Wide Web.

Although fundamentally a synthesis language (imitative of if not directly inspired by Csound and other MUSIC-N languages), JSyn has a number of powerful extensions and ancillary libraries, including JMSL (a Java update to the HMSL music specification language) and JScore (a staff notation editor and library), which adds a significantly higher level of musical informatics to the package than would normally be supplied with a set of synthesis routines.  Wire, a graphical editor for JSyn routines, also allows developers to create DSP chains using a simple GUI that gives the API some of the ease of use of programs such as Max/MSP.

A commercial (though inexpensive) developer license allows JSyn to be incorporated into commercial applications.

External links
JSyn Home Page
JMSL Home Page

Audio programming languages
Audio libraries
Java platform